The PL-21 or PL-XX is an active radar-guided long range beyond-visual-range air-to-air missile developed by the People's Republic of China. It is considered comparable to the American AIM-260 JATM, DARPA's Triple Threat Terminator (T3), and the Russian R-37 (missile).

Development and history
In 2016, China successfully test fired a very long range air-to-air missile, which was believed to be the PL-21. PL-21 is estimated to have a range of over 300 kilometers and powered by a ramjet engine.

Operators

 People's Liberation Army Air Force
 People's Liberation Army Naval Air Force

See also

References

Bibliography

Air-to-air missiles of the People's Republic of China
Weapons of the People's Republic of China